HSwMS Mjölner was a coastal destroyer of the Royal Swedish Navy, built by Eriksbergs Mekaniska Verkstad and launched on 9 April 1942 as the last of the four ship . After serving during World War II, the ship was updated and reclassified a frigate in 1953. Decommissioned in 1966, Mjölner was sold for scrap in 1969.

Design and development

Mjölner was based on the design the  designed in Italy. Small and designed for coastal operation, the vessel was named after Thor's hammer, Mjölner.

Displacement was  standard and  full load. A crew of 100 officers and ratings was carried.

Machinery consisted of two Penhoët A oil-fired boilers, which supplied steam to two de Laval geared steam turbines, each driving its own propeller.

The main armament consisted of three  K/50 M42 guns produced by Bofors. These were placed in separate mounts, one on the fore deck, one on the aft deck and one on the aft superstructure. Air defence consisted two  K/60 M36 and two  K/66 M40 individually mounted anti-aircraft autocannons, also provided by Bofors. Three torpedo tubes for  torpedoes were triple mounted aft of the superstructure and two depth charge throwers were mounted further towards the stern. 42 mines could also be carried for minelaying.

Construction and service
Mjölner was laid down by Eriksbergs Mekaniska Verkstad in Gothenburg in September 1941. The vessel was launched on 9 April 1942 and commissioned on 12 November 1943, serving with the Coastal Fleet through World War II. The ship was allocated the pennant number 32.

Modernisation
Mjölner was modernised in 1953 and re-rated as a frigate. One of the  main guns was removed, along with the triple  torpedo tubes. A single Squid depth charge launcher was fitted to improve anti-submarine capabilities and the  guns were upgraded.

After the conversion, Mode retained minelaying capability. The upgraded ship was allocated the pennant number 73.

Disposal
Mjölner was decommissioned on 1 April 1966 and sold for scrap on 3 November 1969.

References

Citations

Bibliography
 
 
 
 
 
 
 
 

1942 ships
Ships built in Gothenburg
Mode-class destroyers
World War II naval ships of Sweden